The 1954–55 Kansas Jayhawks men's basketball team represented the University of Kansas during the 1954–55 college men's basketball season. The Jayhawks were coached by Phog Allen who in his 36th season of his second tenure, 38th season overall. Kansas played their home games primarily at Hoch Auditorium, however, they did play their first game at Allen Fieldhouse, named after their head coach, on March 1, 1955 against Kansas State. They would play one more game at Allen Fieldhouse that season. The Jayhawks finished 11–10 and failed to qualify for the NCAA tournament.

Roster
Dallas Dobbs
Gene Elstun
Bill Brainard
Lew Johnson
John Parker
John Anderson
Maurice King
Gary Padgett
Larry Davenport
Blaine Hollinger
Chris Divich
Ron Johnston
Lee Green
Harry Jett
Jack Wolfe
Jerry Alberts
Jim Toft
Bill Heitholt
Dick Warren
Allan Hurst

Schedule

References

Kansas Jayhawks men's basketball seasons
Kansas
Kansas
Kansas